Chelle Flamoe is a former women's basketball player who played in college for the Oregon State Beavers, and, later, on the United States Women's Basketball Olympic team.

College
Flamoe ranks third on the Oregon State all-time list for points scored with 1,851. She is also the only Oregon State player to lead the Beavers in minutes played for four consecutive seasons, playing over 1,000 minutes each. She made 784 field goals out of 1516 attempts for a 51.7% career field goal percentage. She recorded over 400 rebounds and assists, as well as over 200 steals.

Honors include making the NorPac All-Freshman Team in 1986, being an All-Pac-10 Team Honorable Mention in 1987, and becoming an All-Pac-10 first team member in both 1988 and 1989.  She was also an Academic All-American second team member in 1987, and was Academic All-American first team member and the Academic All-American Player of the Year in both 1988 and 1989.

Olympic team
Flamoe played in the U.S. Olympic Festival in 1986.

References

Living people
Oregon State Beavers women's basketball players
Year of birth missing (living people)
American women's basketball players